Dragonsphere is a point-and-click graphic adventure game developed and published by MicroProse in 1994. It has graphics which were considered high-quality at the time it was published, considered a novelty. It is still a cult classic for many.

The game was the third, and last, graphical adventure game developed by MicroProse, following Rex Nebular and Return of the Phantom. It was designed by Douglas Kaufman and developed using the MicroProse Adventure Development system with 256-color graphics.

Plot
The story, taking place in a fantasy world, revolves around a magical sphere where the evil sorcerer, Sanwe, was trapped by the late King of Gran Callahach 20 years ago and he is about to break free.

The newly crowned king, Callash, goes on a quest to stop the wizard before he regains his powers. However, when he faces Sanwe, he discovers that he is not the real king but a shapechanger named Pid Shuffle. It is revealed that the Queen Mother concocted the scheme to get rid of Callash and put his evil brother MacMorn on the throne, persuading the Court Wizard to aid her under the false pretense of saving Callash from mortal danger. It falls to Pid to rescue the rightful King and defeat MacMorn.

Characters
King Callash:  The newly crowned king of Gran Callahach.
Pid Shuffle:  A shapechanger, can change into a snake, seal and a bear.
Sanwe:  The main villain of the first half of the game, a magically trapped evil sorcerer.
MacMorn: King Callash's overambitious brother.
Llanie de Summers: A young Duchess, loyal to King Callash.
Queen Mother: Wife to the late king and mother of Callash and MacMorn.
Fiona:  King Callash's wife and reigning Queen.
Ner-Tom:  The Court Wizard of Gran Callahach.

Reception
Pelit gave the game 92 out of 100 and summarized that Dragonsphere is "a really enjoyable and atmospheric adventure which holds the player's attention until the end." Computer Gaming World rated the game four stars out of five, praising its "true-to-life" animation. Although stating that experienced players might find the game too easy or short, the magazine concluded that Dragonspheres puzzles and story made it "an enjoyable and satisfying piece of work". Computer Gaming World nominated Dragonsphere as its 1994 "Adventure of the Year", although it lost to Relentless: Twinsen's Adventure. The editors praised Dragonsphere for incorporating "an intriguing storyline, imaginative fantasy cultures, and a wonderful conversation system".

Legacy
In 1994, Sanctuary Woods purchased the MicroProse Adventure Development System game engine.

In 2011, GOG.com released the game for free. It was released on Steam in 2014. Tommo purchased the rights to this game and digitally published it in 2015, through its Retroism brand.

References

External links

1994 video games
DOS games
Fantasy video games
Freeware games
Games commercially released with DOSBox
MacOS games
MicroProse games
Point-and-click adventure games
Single-player video games
Video games developed in the United States
Video games with rotoscoped graphics
Windows games
Tommo games